John Chaloner may refer to:
 John Seymour Chaloner, British-born journalist who founded the German newsweekly Der Spiegel
 John Armstrong Chaloner, American writer and activist

See also
 John Challoner, secretary of state for Ireland
 John Stopford Challener, British trade union leader